This article shows all participating team squads at the 2011 Women's Pan-American Volleyball Cup, held from July 1 to 9, 2010 in Ciudad Juárez, Mexico.

Head Coach: Horacio Bastit

Head Coach: José Roberto Guimarães

Head Coach: Arnd Ludwig

Head Coach: Hugo Jáuregui

Head Coach: Braulio Godínez

Head Coach: Juan Carlos Gala

Head Coach: Marcos Kwiek

Head Coach: Mario Herrera

Head Coach: Luca Cristofani

Head Coach: David Alemán

Head Coach: Francisco Cruz Jiménez

Head Coach: Hugh McCutcheon

References

External links
 NORCECA

P
P